The Honorable Senate of the Argentine Nation is the upper house of the National Congress of Argentina.

Overview
The National Senate was established by the Argentine Confederation on July 29, 1854, pursuant to Articles 46 to 54 of the 1853 Constitution. There are 72 members: three for each province and three for the Autonomous City of Buenos Aires. The number of senators per province was raised from two to three following the 1994 amendment of the Argentine Constitution as well as the addition of the Autonomous City of Buenos Aires' senators. Those changes took effect following the May 14, 1995, general elections.

Senators are elected to six-year terms by direct election on a provincial basis, with the party with the most votes being awarded two of the province's senate seats and the second-place party receiving the third seat. Historically, Senators were indirectly elected to nine-year terms by each provincial legislature. These provisions were abolished in the 1994 constitutional amendment, and the first direct elections to the Senate took effect in 2001. Currently one-third of the members are elected every two years, with one-third of the provinces hold senatorial elections every two years; there are no term limits.

The Vice President of the Republic is ex officio President of the Senate, with a casting vote in the event of a tie. In practice, the Provisional President presides over the chamber most of the time.

The Senate must obtain quorum to deliberate, this being an absolute majority. It has the power to approve bills passed by the Chamber of Deputies, call for joint sessions with the lower house or special sessions with experts and interested parties, and submit bills for the president's signature; bills introduced in the Senate must, in turn, be approved by the Chamber of Deputies for their submittal to the president. The Senate must introduce any changes to federal revenue sharing policies, ratify international treaties, approve changes to constitutional or federal criminal laws, as well as confirm or impeach presidential nominees to the cabinet, the judiciary, the armed forces, and the diplomatic corps, among other federal posts.

There are twenty-four standing committees made up of
fifteen members each, namely:

Agreements (confirmation of federal nominees)
Constitutional Affairs
Foreign Affairs and Worship
Justice and Criminal Affairs
General Legislation
Budget and Finance
Administrative and Municipal Affairs
National Defense
Domestic Security and Drug Trafficking
National Economy and Investment
Industry and Trade
Regional Economies, Micro, Small and Medium Enterprises
Labor and Social Security
Agriculture, Cattle Raising and Fishing
Education, Culture, Science and Technology
Rights and Guarantees
Mining, Energy and Fuels
Health and Sports
Infrastructure, Housing and Transport
Systems, Media and Freedom of Speech
Environment and Human Development
Population and Human Development
Federal Revenue Sharing
Tourism.

Requirements
According to Section 55 of the Argentine Constitution, candidates for the Argentine Senate must:
 be at least 30 years old
 have been a citizen of Argentina for six years
 be native to the province of his office, or have been a resident of that province for two years.

Composition

The current members of the Senate were elected in 2017, 2019 and 2021.

Senate leadership
The titular President of the Senate is the Vice President of Argentina. However, day to day leadership of the Senate is exercised by the Provisional President.

Current leadership positions include:

See also

List of current Argentine senators
Argentine Chamber of Deputies
List of former Argentine Senators
List of legislatures by country

References

External links

 

Argentina
Senate
National Congress of Argentina
1854 establishments in Argentina